Yürekveren is a village in the Kastamonu District of Kastamonu Province, Turkey. Its population is 223 (2021).

References

Villages in Kastamonu District